The following is a partial list of compositions by James Hotchkiss Rogers.

By category

Large works
The Man Of Nazareth, A Lenten Cantata For SATB Soli, Mixed Chorus and Organ, G. Schirmer, 1903
The New Life, Easter Cantata

Chamber music
Alla Polacca, Op. 27. No. 2, violin and piano, Oliver Ditson, 1901

Service music
Jubilate in D (O Be Joyful), Oliver Ditson, 1915
Sabbath Morning Service for the Synagogue
Service for Sabbath evening, according to the Union Prayer Book, G. Schirmer, ©1912
Temple Service for the Evening of the New Year

Church anthems and motets
Asperges Me, Oliver Ditson, 1900
Ave, Maris Stella, women's voices, Oliver Ditson, 1900
Awake Up, My Glory, bass solo, SATB chorus, organ, G. Schirmer, 1908
Beloved, if God so Loved Us, SATB chorus and organ, G. Schirmer, 1908
Benedicite, Omnia Opera, SATB chorus and organ, G. Schirmer, 1912
Break Forth into Joy, (Easter), in The Church Choralist, No. 406, 1908
A Call to Worship, G. Schirmer, ©1916
Fear Not O Land (Harvest or Thanksgiving), SATB chorus and organ, G. Schirmer, 1902
I will Lift Up Mine Eyes, SATB chorus and organ, G. Schirmer, 1914
I will Wash my Hands in Innocency, soprano solo, SATB chorus and organ, G. Schirmer, ©1916
Let us Now Go Even Unto Bethlehem (Christmas), Oliver Ditson, 1915
Look on the Fields (Harvest), Oliver Ditson, 1915
The Lord Is My Strength, Oliver Ditson, 1915
My Sheep Hear My Voice, Oliver Ditson, 1915
O How Amiable are Thy Dwellings, Oliver Ditson, 1915
O Lord, Our Lord, How Excellent Thy Name, Oliver Ditson, 1915
The Pillars of the Earth, Oliver Ditson, 1915
Praise Ye the Lord, Oliver Ditson, 1915
Seek Him that Maketh the Seven Stars, Oliver Ditson, 1915
Sing, O Daughter of Zion! (Christmas), soprano solo, SATB chorus and organ, G. Schirmer, ©1915

Secular choral works and partsongs
At Parting, song arrangement for 2-part women's voices, G. Schirmer, 1926
Bedouin Song, men's voices and piano, G. Schirmer, 1905
But—They Didn't (E. V. Cooke), 4-part men's voices TTBB and piano, G. Schirmer, 1911
The Snow Storm (Katharine Pyle), women's voices SSAA and piano, G. Schirmer, 1913
Some Reckon Time by Stars (Madison Julius Cawein), 4-part men's voices TTBB, G. Schirmer, 1910/1916
The Two Clocks (M. Erskine), women's voices SSAA, Oliver Ditson, 1910
This Is She (Anonymous), 4-part men's voices TTBB and piano, G. Schirmer, ©1915

Organ music
Berceuse in A major, Oliver Ditson, 1911
Five Organ Pieces, G. Schirmer, 1907
Andante quasi Fantasia
Cantilène
Cortège Nuptial
Offertoire
Scherzoso
Four Organ Pieces, G. Schirmer, ©1908
Christmas Pastorale 
Invocation 
Prelude in D Major 
Grand Chœur
Four Pieces for Organ, G. Schirmer, ©1905
Prelude in Db Major
Bridal Song 
Sortie in G Major
Sortie in D Minor
Preludes and Intermezzos, Seven short pieces for the organ, Sam Fox Publishing, ©1918
Serenata
Pomposo
Con Sentimente
Pastorale
Orientale
Allegretto Scherzando
Religioso
Processional March, G. Schirmer, ©1910
Reverie, G. Schirmer ©1910
Second Toccata in C minor, Oliver Ditson, 1911
Sonata No. 1 in E minor, G. Schirmer,  ©1910
Sonata No. 2 in D minor, G. Schirmer, 1921
Sortie in F major, Oliver Ditson, 1911
Suite for Organ No. 1, G. Schirmer, ©1905
Prologue (Molto maestoso)
March (Tempo moderato ma con spirito)
Intermezzo (Andantino)
Toccata (Introduction: Lento assai, Toccata: Allegro)
Suite for Organ No. 2, Theodore Press, ©1915
Preambule (Con moto moderato)
Theme and variations (Andante, 4 variations)
Pastorale (Allegretto)
Scherzo (Vivace ma non troppo)
Epilogue (Con moto moderato) 
Third Sonata in B flat, G. Schirmer, 1923

Piano music
Air de Ballet, Op. 24. No. 1, Oliver Ditson, 1904
Alla Marcia, Op. 53. No. 1, Oliver Ditson, 1903
Along a Country Road, C. F. Summy Co., 1914
A merry party
Birds in the branches
The gypsies are coming
By the brookside
Deux Morceaux pour le Piano, G. Schirmer, 1907
Au Rouet (At the Spinning Wheel)
Valse Gracieuse
Autrefois, Petite Suite dans le style ancien pour Piano, G. Schirmer, 1903
Allemande
Courante
Air varié
Menuet
Gigue
The Bucking Pony, Bendix Publishing Co., 1930
The Development of Velocity, Exercises and Studies for Pianoforte, Op. 40, G. Schirmer, 1902
Octave Velocity, Twenty-four Exercises and Etudes for the Pianoforte, Music Mastery Series, Theodore Presser, 1910
Ten Octave-Studies for Pianoforte, G. Schirmer, 1908
Toy-Shop Sketches, Tune melodies for little folk, Theodore Presser, 1915
Jolly teddy bears
Toy soldiers' march
Dance of the toys
Fairy stories
Hobby horse
Punch and Judy show
Dolly's delight

Sacred art songs
Great Peace Have They which Love Thy Law (text "From the Psalms"), G. Schirmer, ©1908 
How Long, O Lord, Wilt Thou Forget Me?, G. Schirmer
A Prayer (Alfred Noyes), G. Schirmer, ©1918
They That Sow in Tears, G. Schirmer
Two Offertory Solos, Arthur P. Schmidt, ©1904
To-day if ye will hear His voice
Out of the Depths

Secular art songs
Absence (Pai Ta-Shun/Frederick Peterson), G. Schirmer, 1915
And Love Means—You, G. Schirmer
April Weather (Ednah Proctor Clarke), Oliver Ditson, 1904
At Parting (Frederick Peterson), G. Schirmer, ©1886, published 1906
Aus Meinen Tränen Spriessen, G. Schirmer
Autumn (F. Dana Burnet, G. Schirmer
Barcarolle, G. Schirmer
Bid Me to Live (Robert Herrick), Oliver Ditson, 1899
Boot and Saddle: Cavalier Song (Robert Browning), Rogers & Eastman, 1900, reprinted by G. Schirmer
Candlelight, Song of Christmas-tide (G. Hamilton), G. Schirmer, 1921
The Captain (Margaret Darrel), Boston Music Co., ©1898
The Cavalry, G. Schirmer
Chanson de Printemps (All the World Awakens), G. Schirmer
Déclaration, G. Schirmer
Dumb Dora, Soliloquy for Medium Voice
Ecstasy (Duncan Campbell Scott), G. Schirmer, ©1908
Five Quatrains From The Rubáiyát Of Omar Khayyám (Omar Khayyám), Oliver Ditson, 1914
A book of verses underneath the bough
The moving finger writes
Yet ah, that spring should vanish with the rose
For some we loved
So when that angel of the darker drink
Fly, White Butterflies, G. Schirmer
Four Favorites after Mother Goose, Theodor Presser, 1914
Mary, Mary, quite contrary
Little Miss Muffet
Old Mother Hubbard
Little Jack Horner
Im Wunderschönen Monat Mai, G. Schirmer
In Harbour, G. Schirmer
In Memorium, A Cycle of Songs
Dark mother, always gliding near (Walt Whitman)
Requiem (Robert Louis Stevenson)
The last invocation (Walt Whitman)
Joy, shipmate, joy! (Walt Whitman)
After death in Arabia (Sir Edwin Arnold)
Sail forth! (Walt Whitman)
Invocation (Fred G. Bowles), Sam Fox Publishing, ©1917
Julia's Garden (Charles Edward Thomas), G. Schirmer
La Chanson de ma Mie (The Song of My Dearest), G. Schirmer
The Last Song, G. Schirmer, 1922
The Loreley, G. Schirmer
A Love Note (Frank Lebby Stanton), G. Schirmer, ©1900 
Love's on the High-Road (F. Dana Burnet), G. Schirmer, 1914
Moods, G. Schirmer,  ©1900
Not from the Whole Wide World I Choose Thee (Richard Watson Gilder)
Years Have Flown Since I Knew Thee First (Richard Watson Gilder)
You (Louise Chandler Moulton)
Who Knows? (Louise Chandler Moulton)
Requiescat, G. Schirmer
Reveille, G. Schirmer
Sea Fever (John Mansfield), G. Schirmer
A Song of Changing Love, G. Schirmer
Sweetest Flower That Blows
Three Songs, G. Schirmer, ©1912
Amulets (Brian Hooker)
Cloud-Shadows (Katharine Pyle)
The Star: A Fragment from Plato (Charles F. Lummis)
The Time for Making Songs has Come (Hermann Hagedorn), Oliver Ditson, 1919
Träumerei, G. Schirmer
Two Songs, G. Schirmer, ©1908
Extasy (Duncan Campbell Scott)
Oh, Drink Thou Deep of the Purple Wine (Alice Dunbar)
The Voice of April, G. Schirmer
The Wage of the Fighting Men, G. Schirmer
War (F. Dana Burnet), Oliver Ditson, 1915
When Pershing's Men go Marching into Picardy (D. Burnet), Oliver Ditson, 1918
Wild Geese (Frederick Peterson), G. Schirmer, ©1915
Wind Song (A. Hugh Fisher), G. Schirmer, ©1915
Yesterday Ran Roses, G. Schirmer

Footnotes

External links

Lists of compositions by composer